Nancy Bea Hefley (born February 24, 1936) was the stadium organist for 27 years for Major League Baseball's Los Angeles Dodgers.

Biography

Early life
Bea grew up in the Los Angeles area, and began playing the piano at age 4 by listening to her seventeen-year-old sister, and by the age of seven she was also proficient at playing the accordion. At the age of thirteen, she talked her piano teacher into teaching her the basics of the organ. She has been playing the organ at Bellflower Baptist Church for over 55 years; it was there that she met her husband, Bill. She also plays the organ at the Orange County Fair, the Pomona Fair, and has played shows in Las Vegas and Lake Tahoe.

Los Angeles Dodgers organist
In the mid-1980s, Bea filled in for a friend as the organist for California Angels games at Angel Stadium, and was offered a job which she declined not wishing to take work from a friend. When it was announced in 1987 that long-time Dodger organist Helen Dell was to retire at the end of the season after fifteen years, Bea auditioned at an exhibition game between the Dodgers and the USC Trojans on February 14, 1988.  She did not preplan her programs, getting her cues from the events occurring on the field during the game and including a variety of popular pop and rock songs alongside older and less commonly played numbers.
Bea– alongside announcers Vin Scully and Rick Monday– was a great crowd favorite at Dodger Stadium.

On October 2, 2015, Bea announced her retirement following the 2015 season and was replaced with Los Angeles Kings organist Dieter Ruehle.

References
 

Living people
American organists
Stadium organists
Women organists
Los Angeles Dodgers personnel
People from San Pedro, Los Angeles
21st-century organists
21st-century American women musicians
1936 births